This is a list of notable people from Malawi:

Activists

 Chikondi Chabvuta
 Emmie Chanika
 John Chilembwe
 Rafiq Hajat

Artists 

 Felix Mnthali
 Frank Chipasula
 Jack Mapanje
 John Lwanda
 Shemu Joyah
 Stanley Onjezani Kenani
 Steve Chimombo

Journalist

Politicians

 Attati Mpakati
 Bakili Muluzi
 Bingu wa Mutharika
 Bester Bisani – former MP and chairperson of Presidential Dialog Committee 
 Brown Chimphamba – VC, University of Malawi (1990s), current Ambassador to the United Nations
 Brown Mpinganjira
 Chakufwa Chihana
 David Rubadiri – VC, University of Malawi (until 2005)
 Davis Katsonga
 Dunduzu Chisiza
 Eric Chiwaya
 George Chaponda
 Gwanda Chakuamba
 Hastings Kamuzu Banda
 Henry Chipembere
 John Zenas Ungapake Tembo – leader of opposition, Governor of Reserve Bank
 Joyce Banda
 Kanyama Chiume
 Maxwell Mkwezalamba – Minister, OAU
 Yatuta Chisiza
 Zimani Kadzamira – former VC, University of Malawi

Science & Technology

 Rachel Sibande (born 1986) – computer scientist 
 William Kamkwamba – inventor

Sports Persons

 Esau Kanyenda – Malawi's best striker
 Tamika Mkandawire – football player

Writers

Drake Thadzi

Business Men and Women 
 Simbi Phiri
  Shepherd Bushiri

Other

 Cecilia Kadzamira
 Charles Domingo
 Elliot Kamwana
 Allan Ngumuya
 Hetherwick Ntaba
 Jane Kambalame – Ambassador to Zimbabwe
 Justin Malewezi
 Orton Chirwa
 Vera Chirwa
 William Kamkwamba
 Mike Kanyundo – researcher

See also

 Outline of Malawi